Matthew Ferguson is an actor.

Matthew Ferguson may also refer to:

Matthew Ferguson (Scottish footballer) (c. 1873–1902), Scottish footballer
Matthew Ferguson (Australian footballer) (born 1984), former Australian rules footballer
Matthew Paul Ferguson (born 1958), rock drummer
Matt Kennon (Matthew Carl Ferguson), American country music singer and songwriter
Matt Ferguson (born 1966), CEO